This page is a list of districts of Papua New Guinea.

Administrative divisions
On the highest level, Papua New Guinea is divided into 4 regions, which are Highlands, Islands, Momase, and Southern regions.

Below, Papua New Guinea has 22 province-level divisions: 20 integrated provinces, the autonomous province of North Solomons (Bougainville) and the National Capital District.

Each province has one or more districts, and each district has one or more local-level government (LLG) areas. For census purposes, the LLG areas are subdivided into wards and those into census units.

Wards typically consist of a few hundred to a few thousand individuals, and are the lowest level of government administration under local-level governments (LLGs).

List of districts by region and province

Highlands Region

Chimbu Province
Chuave District
Gumine District
Karimui-Nomane District
Kerowagi District
Kundiawa-Gembogl District
Sina Sina-Yonggomugl District (Sinasina-Yonggomugl District)

Eastern Highlands Province

Daulo District
Goroka District
Henganofi District
Kainantu District
Lufa District
Obura-Wonenara District
Okapa District
Unggai-Benna District

Enga Province
Kandep District
Kompiam Ambum District
Lagaip District
Wapenamanda District
Wabag District
Porgera-Paiela District

Southern Highlands Province
Ialibu-Pangia District
Imbonggu District
Kagua-Erave District
Mendi-Munihu District
Nipa-Kutubu District

Western Highlands Province
Dei District
Mount Hagen District
Mul-Baiyer District
Tambul-Nebilyer District

Hela Province
Magarima District
Koroba-Kopiago District
Tari-Pori District
Komo-Hulia

Jiwaka Province
Anglimp-South Waghi District
Jimi District
North Waghi District

Islands Region

East New Britain Province
Gazelle District
Kokopo District
Pomio District
Rabaul District

Manus Province
Manus District

New Ireland Province

Kavieng District
Namatanai District

West New Britain Province
Kandrian-Gloucester District
Talasea District
Nakanai District

Autonomous Region of Bougainville (Bougainville Region)

Central Bougainville District
North Bougainville District
South Bougainville District

Momase Region

East Sepik Province
Ambunti-Dreikikier District
Angoram District
Maprik District
Wewak District
Wosera-Gawi District
Yangoru-Saussia District

Madang Province
Bogia District
Madang District
Middle Ramu District
Rai Coast District
Sumkar District
Usino Bundi District

Morobe Province
Finschhafen District
Huon District
Kabwum District
Lae District
Markham District
Menyamya District
Nawae District
Tawae-Siassi District
Bulolo_District
Wau-Waria District

Sandaun (West Sepik) Province
Aitape-Lumi District
Nuku District
Telefomin District
Vanimo-Green River District

Southern Region

Central Province
Abau District
Goilala District
Kairuku District
Hiri-Koiari District
Rigo District

Gulf Province
Kerema District
Kikori District

Milne Bay Province
Alotau District
Esa'ala District
Kiriwini-Goodenough District
Samarai-Murua District

Oro (Northern) Province

Ijivitari District
Sohe District
Popondetta District

Western (Fly) Province

North Fly District
Middle Fly District
South Fly District
Delta Fly

National Capital District
National Capital District

See also 
 Local-level governments of Papua New Guinea
 Provinces of Papua New Guinea
 Regions of Papua New Guinea
 List of cities and towns in Papua New Guinea
 List of cities and towns in Papua New Guinea by population

References

External links
National Statistical Office, Papua New Guinea (2011 National Population and Housing Census documents)
Mapping Application with a lot of detail down to the LLG level
LLG boundary maps by Province
Local Level Government listInter Government relations department of PNG
PNG Business Directory 
List of District Capitals 
Schedule of Polling for 2007 electionPNG Electoral Commission (document contains LLG details)
List of LLGs by Province, with Presidents or Mayors

 
Subdivisions of Papua New Guinea
Papua New Guinea, Districts
Papua New Guinea 2
Districts, Papua New Guinea
Papua New Guinea geography-related lists